Kali Khola (Nepali: काली खोला) is a tributary of the Seti Gandaki River in Nepal. It joins the Seti Gandaki in the ward of Bagar in Pokhara.

References

Rivers of Gandaki Province